Gundamma Gaari Manavadu (Mrs. Gundamma's grandson) is a 2007 Indian Telugu-language film starring Ali, Sindhuri, and Nicole. The film is directed by B. Jaya. The film was released on 28 April 2007. The film was commercially successful and ran for fifty days.

Plot
The title is suggestive of a grandmother-grandson relationship. Yedukondalu (played by comedian Ali) is looked after by his grandmother Gundamma (Vadivukkarasi) after his mother's death while his father, Srisailam (Tanikella Bharani) is an alcoholic. Ali falls in love with Mahalakshmi (Sindhuri), whose father Neelakanta (Kota Srinivasa Rao) is a greedy person and wants his would-be son-in-law to own a hotel. With the help of his grandmother (she sells off her jewellery) Yedukondalu sets up a hotel.

Neelakatna reluctantly agrees to the match but later calls off the wedding after receiving a better marriage proposal for his daughter. Yedukondalu is beaten up and dumped on the railway track. Injured, he nevertheless rescues a girl (Nicole) stuck in a car on the tracks. Together they join hands to set up a successful restaurant. Yedukondalu then distances himself from Mahalakshmi. Whether he ends up with her makes up the rest of the story.

Cast
Ali as Edu Kondalu
Kota Srinivasa Rao as Neelakanta
Vadivukkarasi as  Gundamma
Tanikella Bharani as Srisailam
Sindhuri as Mahalakshmi
Nicole 
Jayalalita
Narsing Yadav

References

External links
News Article on The Hindu

2007 films
2000s Telugu-language films